China Wall may refer to:

Great Wall of China
Perth (China Wall) Commonwealth War Graves Commission Cemetery
Nickname of Johnny Bower, professional ice hockey goaltender

See also
 Chinawal, a village in the Jalgaon district of Maharashtra state, India